Povilas Meškėla (born June 29, 1964 in Vilnius, Lithuania) is a Lithuanian rock musician and a leading singer of a rock band Rojaus tūzai and formerly Katedra.

He started his career in 1986 and was a co-founder of a band Rojaus tūzai in 1990.

Povilas was chosen a national AIDS ambassador of Lithuania in 1999.

Discography

With a band Katedra
Mors Ultima Ratio (1989, LP)

With a band Rojaus tūzai
Vodk'N'Roll (1993, LP)
Tikras Garsas (1996)
Drugys (1997)
Russkij albom (2002)
Nepasiduok (2012)

References

1964 births
Living people
Musicians from Vilnius
Lithuanian rock musicians
Lithuanian people of Polish descent
Bandleaders
HIV/AIDS activists